The State President of the Republic of South Africa was the head of state of South Africa from 1961 to 1994. The office was established when the country became a republic on 31 May 1961, albeit, outside the Commonwealth of Nations, and Queen Elizabeth II ceased to be Queen of South Africa. The position of Governor-General of South Africa was accordingly abolished. From 1961 to 1984, the post was largely ceremonial. After constitutional reforms enacted in 1983 and taking effect in 1984, the State President became an executive post, and its holder was both head of state and head of government.

The State President was appointed by both Houses of the Parliament of South Africa (Senate of South Africa and the House of Assembly of South Africa) in the form of an electoral college.

The office was abolished in 1994, with the end of Apartheid and the transition to democratic majority rule. Since then, the head of state and head of government is known simply as the President of South Africa.

Ceremonial post

Republicanism had long been a plank in the platform of the ruling National Party. However, it was not until 1960, 12 years after it took power, that it was able to hold a referendum on the issue. A narrow majority—52 percent— of the minority white electorate voted in favour of abolishing the monarchy and declaring South Africa a republic.

The Republic of South Africa was proclaimed on 31 May 1961. Charles Robberts Swart, the last Governor-General, was sworn in as the first State President. The title 'State President' was originally used for the head of state of the Boer Republics, and like them, the holder of the office wore a sash with the Republic's coat of arms. He was elected to a seven-year term by the Parliament of South Africa, and was not eligible for re-election.

The National Party decided against having an executive presidency, instead adopting a minimalist approach as a conciliatory gesture to English-speaking whites who were opposed to a republic. As such, the State President performed mostly ceremonial duties, and was bound by convention to act on the advice of the Prime Minister and the cabinet.

In practice, the post of State President was a sinecure for retired National Party ministers, as the Governor-General's post had been since 1948.  Consequently, all State Presidents from 1961 to 1984 were white, Afrikaner, male, and over 60.

Executive post

Following constitutional reforms, in 1984, the office of State President became an executive post, as in the United States. The Prime Minister's post was abolished, and its powers were de facto merged with those of the State President. He was elected by an electoral college of 88 members – 50 Whites, 25 Coloureds, and 13 Indians – from among the members of the Tricameral Parliament. The members of the electoral college were elected by the respective racial groups of the Tricameral Parliament – the white House of Assembly, Coloured House of Representatives and Indian House of Delegates. He held office for the Parliament's duration—in practice, five years. The last Prime Minister, P. W. Botha, was elected as the first executive State President.

The State President was vested with sweeping executive powers – in most respects, even greater than those of comparative offices like the President of the United States. He had sole jurisdiction over matters of "national" concern, such as foreign policy and race relations. He was chairman of the President's Council, which resolved disputes between the three chambers regarding "general affairs" legislation. This body consisted of 60 members – 20 members appointed by the House of Assembly, 10 by the House of Representatives, five by the House of Delegates and 25 directly by the State President.

Although the reforms were billed as a power-sharing arrangement, the composition of the electoral college and President's Council made it all but impossible for the white chamber to be outvoted on any substantive matter. Thus, the real power remained in white hands – and in practice, in the hands of the National Party, which had a large majority in the white chamber.  As Botha was leader of the National Party, the system placed nearly all governing power in his hands.

Botha resigned in 1989 and was succeeded by F. W. de Klerk, who oversaw the transition to majority rule in 1994.

End of white minority rule

Under South Africa's first non-racial constitution, adopted in 1994, the head of state (and of government) is known simply as the President. However, since the declaration of the republic in 1961, most non-South African sources had referred to the State President as simply the "President". The leader of the African National Congress, Nelson Mandela, was sworn in as president on 10 May 1994.

List of state presidents of South Africa

Political parties

Symbols

Timeline

See also

State President of the South African Republic
State President of the Orange Free State
Governor-General of the Union of South Africa
President of South Africa
Prime Minister of South Africa
Vice State President of South Africa

References

External links

 List of Presidents
 Lists of Heads of state with links to bios

 
Politics of South Africa
Lists of political office-holders in South Africa
Apartheid government
1961 establishments in South Africa
1994 disestablishments in South Africa

fr:Présidents d'Afrique du Sud
id:Presiden Afrika Selatan
ja:南アフリカの大統領
pl:Prezydenci Republiki Południowej Afryki
pt:Presidente de Estado da África do Sul